Mahama Cho (born 16 August 1989) is a taekwondo practitioner who competes in the +87 kg category. Born in the Ivory Coast, he has represented both Great Britain and France in the sport.

Early life and personal life
Abdoufata Cho Mahama was raised by his grandmother in the Ivory Coast; his father was abroad and his mother was unable to care for him. A practising Muslim, he attended an Arabic school in Abidjan. As a child, Cho was bullied.

Cho moved to London at the age of eight, at the request of his father. Cho's father Zakaia was a former African taekwondo champion who was teaching the sport there whilst also driving taxis. When he arrived in England, staying first in Kennington and then in Stockwell, Cho was unable to speak any English. He lived with his father's new family, forming a particularly close friendship with his step-brother David.

In 2014, he became engaged to French heptathlete Antoinette Nana Djimou. but their relationship ended in late 2017.

Football career
Cho played semi-professionally for Erith Town. He trialled with Dagenham and Redbridge at the age of 16. He gave up his football career at the age of 17 to focus on taekwondo.

Taekwondo career
He joined the British taekwondo squad at the age of 17. He was injured at the 2011 World Championships. After that event, he moved to Paris to study. He joined the French taekwondo squad, winning gold at 2013 Dutch and USA Opens.

After returning to compete for Britain, at the World Taekwondo Grand Prix he won a gold medal in 2013, and a silver medal in 2014. In January 2016 he secured Britain their fourth and final qualifying place for the 2016 Summer Olympics.

Results

2017
    World Taekwondo Championships in Muju, South Korea
    Moldova International Open, in Chisinau, Moldova

2016

5th 2016 Summer Olympics in Rio de Janeiro, Brazil

2015
    President's Cup, in Hamburg, Germany
    European Olympic Qualification Tournament, in Istanbul, Turkey
   Polish International Open, in Warsaw, Poland
   US Open, in Las Vegas, United States
  Serbia International Open, in Belgrad, Serbia
  Grand Prix, in Moscow, Russia

2014
  Paris International Open, in Paris, France
  Commonwealth Championships in Edinburgh, Scotland
  Swiss International Open
  Bahrain International Open, Bahrain
  Grand Prix Series in Astana, Kazakhstan
  Luxor International Open, in Luxor, Egypt
  Fujairah International Open, in United Arab Emirats
  Grand Prix, in Suzhou, China

2013
    Grand Prix Final in Manchester, England
    German International Open, in Hamburg, Germany
    Dutch International Open, in Eindhoven, Nederlands
   Paris International Open, in Paris, France
  Spanish International Open, in Alicante, Spain
  US Open, in Las Vegas, England

2012
    Israel International Open, in Tel-Aviv, Israel
  Spanish International Open, in Alicante, Spain
  Dutch International Open, in Eindhoven, Nederlands

References

External links
 

1989 births
Living people
Ivorian Muslims
British Muslims
Ivorian footballers
English footballers
Ivorian male taekwondo practitioners
English male taekwondo practitioners
French male taekwondo practitioners
Erith Town F.C. players
English people of Ivorian descent
Ivorian emigrants to the United Kingdom
Association footballers not categorized by position
Taekwondo practitioners at the 2016 Summer Olympics
European Games competitors for Great Britain
Taekwondo practitioners at the 2015 European Games
Olympic taekwondo practitioners of Great Britain
World Taekwondo Championships medalists
Taekwondo practitioners at the 2020 Summer Olympics